Maakhir, officially the Maakhir State of Somalia was a short-lived quasi-state in the Sanaag region of eastern Somalia.

History

Somaliland military operations
On 25–26 February 2008, a Somaliland-aligned, well armed force laid siege to Hadaftimo, causing a brief state of emergency before the force withdrew back to western Erigavo.  Maakhir authority responded with a military buildup in the Maakhir-controlled part of Erigavo.

Hostilities re-emerged on 9 July 2008, when Somaliland invaded and occupied Laas Qoray port for few hours, under the pretext of a rescue mission (German citizens were allegedly being held hostage in Laas Qoray by pirates).

References 

Regions of Somalia
States and territories established in 2007
Territorial disputes of Somalia
2007 establishments in Somaliland
Puntland
States and territories disestablished in 2009